Soviet Superstar is a greatest hits album by Russian singer Alla Pugacheva released in 1984 by Track Music in Scandinavia. The album features the best songs from 1976 to 1984. The release of the album was preceded by a number of successful concerts in Finland, as well as an active rotation of the singer's songs on radio and TV.

The record was a great success. In Finland, it reached the second place in the album chart and received a gold certification. In 1985, the second part of the album was released.

Track listing

Charts

References

Bibliography
 

1984 greatest hits albums
Alla Pugacheva albums
Russian-language albums